Like many other academic professional societies, the American Statistical Association (ASA) uses the title of Fellow of the American Statistical Association as its highest honorary grade of membership. The number of new fellows per year is limited to one third of one percent of the membership of the ASA. , the people that have been named as Fellows are listed below.

Fellows

1914

 John Lee Coulter
 Miles Menander Dawson
 Frank H. Dixon
 David Parks Fackler
 Henry Walcott Farnam
 Charles Ferris Gettemy
 Franklin Henry Giddings
 Henry J. Harris
 Edward M. Hartwell
 Joseph A. Hill
 George K. Holmes
 William Chamberlin Hunt
 John Koren
 Thomas Bassett Macaulay
 S. N. D. North
 Warren M. Persons
 Edward B. Phelps
 LeGrand Powers
 William Sidney Rossiter
 Charles H. Verrill
 Cressy L. Wilbur
 S. Herbert Wolfe
 Allyn Abbott Young

1916

 Victor S. Clark
 Frederick Stephen Crum
 Louis Israel Dublin
 Walter Sherman Gifford
 James Waterman Glover
 Royal Meeker
 Wesley Clair Mitchell
 Charles P. Neill
 Julius Hall Parmelee
 George E. Roberts
 I. M. Rubinow

1917

 Leonard Porter Ayres
 Robert E. Chaddock
 Willford I. King
 Max O. Lorenz
 Henry Ludwell Moore
 Albert Henry Mowbray
 Nahum I. Stone
 Frank H. Streightoff
 Edward Thorndike

1918

 Kate Claghorn
 John Cummings
 William A. Hathaway
 Horace Secrist

1920

 F. Stuart Chapin
 Roland P. Falkner
 Abb Landis
 William Fielding Ogburn
 Raymond Pearl
 Ethelbert Stewart

1921

 Charles J. Bullock
 Melvin T. Copeland
 Charles Davenport
 Edmund Ezra Day
 Edwin Francis Gay
 Emanuel Goldenweiser
 John H. Gray
 Lewis Henry Haney
 Louis N. Robinson
 Elihu Root
 Malcolm C. Rorty

1922

 Willard C. Brinton
 Robert H. Coates
 James H. Field
 Arne Fisher
 David Friday
 James Arthur Harris
 F. Leslie Hayford
 Don D. Lescohier
 Roswell F. Phelps
 Joseph E. Pogue
 Horatio Pollock
 Harold Rugg
 Edgar Sydenstricker
 Fred G. Tryon
 George P. Watkins
 Leo Wolman

1923

 W. Leonard Crum
 Truman Lee Kelley
 Frederick Macaulay
 Henry Louis Rietz
 Carl Snyder

1924

 Joseph S. Davis
 Edwin Bidwell Wilson

1926

 Alfred J. Lotka
 Frederick C. Mills

1927

 Seymour L. Andrew
 Lowell Reed
 Walter W. Stewart

1928

 John Rice Miner
 Frank A. Ross

1930

 Warren Randolph Burgess
 Harry C. Carver

1931

 Mordecai Ezekiel
 
 George F. Warren

1932

 Alvin Hansen

1933

 Stuart A. Rice
 Henry Schultz

1934

 William A. Berridge
 Walter A. Shewhart

1935

 Donald R. Belcher
 Winfield W. Riefler
 Woodlief Thomas

1936

 Burton Howard Camp
 Morris Copeland
 Paul R. Rider

1937

 Robert W. Burgess
 Harold Hotelling
 Aryness Joy Wickens
 Simon Kuznets
 O. C. Stine
 Leon E. Truesdell

1939

 Theodore H. Brown
 Arthur R. Crathorne
 Halbert L. Dunn
 Meredith B. Givens
 Charles F. Roos
 George W. Snedecor
 Frederick F. Stephan
 Willard Thorp
 Ralph J. Watkins
 Joseph H. Willits

1940

 Joseph Berkson
 Samuel A. Stouffer
 Helen M. Walker
 Samuel S. Wilks
 Theodore O. Yntema

1941

 J. Frederic Dewhurst
 George O. May
 Vergil D. Reed
 Bradford B. Smith
 Howard R. Tolley
 Pascal K. Whelpton

1942

 Chester Ittner Bliss
 W. Edwards Deming
 Edward L. Dodd
 Edward Vermilye Huntington
 Robert R. Nathan
 Jerzy Neyman
 Frank W. Notestein
 John W. Scoville
 Dorothy Swaine Thomas
 Rufus W. Tucker

1943

 Thomas C. Atkeson
 Merrill K. Bennett
 Arthur F. Burns
 Cecil C. Craig
 Churchill Eisenhart
 George B. Roberts
 Richard E. Scammon
 Arthur R. Tebbutt
 George Terborgh
 Holbrook Working

1944

 Henry B. Arthur
 A. E. Brandt
 William Gemmell Cochran
 Gertrude Mary Cox
 Philip Hauser
 Frank Lorimer
 Isador Lubin
 Charles F. Sarle
 Alan E. Treloar
 Sewall Wright

1945

 Edith Abbott
 A. Ford Hinrichs
 Lester S. Kellogg
 William R. Leonard
 Edward C. Molina
 Hugo Muench
 E. Grosvenor Plowman
 Leslie Earl Simon
 Mary van Kleeck
 Abraham Wald
 Frederick V. Waugh

1946

 Calvert L. Dedrick
 Stephen M. Dubrul
 Meyer A. Girshick
 Irving Lorge
 William G. Madow
 Howard B. Myers
 Gladys L. Palmer
 Faith M. Williams
 Joseph Zubin

1947

 
 Milton Gilbert
 Morris H. Hansen
 William Hurwitz
 Jacob Marschak
 Herbert Marshall

1948

 Eugene L. Grant
 J. W. Hopkins
 Tjalling Koopmans
 W. Allen Wallis

1949

 Theodore Wilbur Anderson
 Walter Bartky
 Dorothy Brady
 Francis G. Cornell
 Harold F. Dodge
 
 William Feller
 Milton Friedman
 Frank R. Garfield
 Margaret Jarman Hagood
 Hildegarde Kneeland
 Rensis Likert
 Frederick Mosteller
 Joseph J. Spengler
 Donald S. Thompson
 Warren Thompson
 Louis Leon Thurstone
 John Tukey
 Charles Winsor

1950

 R. G. D. Allen
 Harald Cramér
 Harold F. Dorn
 A. Ross Eckler
 Raymond J. Jessen
 A. D. H. Kaplan
 Maurice Kendall
 Alexander M. Mood
 Oskar Morgenstern
 Paul L. Olmstead
 Mortimer Spiegelman
 P. V. Sukhatme
 L. H. C. Tippett
 John Wishart
 H. C. Wold

1951

 Richard L. Anderson
 M. S. Bartlett
 William Forest Callander
 Jerome Cornfield
 Besse Day
 Daniel Bertrand DeLury
 Paul Summer Dwyer
 D. J. Finney
 Harold Freeman
 Emil Julius Gumbel
 Paul G. Hoel
 Vladimir Stepanovitch Kolesnidoff
 Margaret Merrell
 Bruce D. Mudgett
 K. R. Nair
 Henry Scheffé
 Henry S. Shryock Jr.
 Gerhard Tintner
 Jacob Wolfowitz
 William J. Youden

1952

 Oskar Anderson
 Murray R. Benedict
 Martin A. Brumbaugh
 Ewan Clague
 Dudley J. Cowden
 Frederick E. Croxton
 Paul Douglas
 W. Duane Evans
 Martin R. Gainsbrugh
 Edwin B. George
 Cyril H. Goulden
 Howard Whipple Green
 Howard C. Grieves
 Harold Gulliksen
 Anders Hald
 Howard L. Jones
 Oscar Kempthorne
 Nathan Keyfitz
 
 Forrest E. Linder
 Giorgio Mortara
 Edwin G. Olds
 William R. Pabst Jr.
 Donald C. Riley
 Benedict Saurino
 Conrad Taeuber
 P. C. Tang
 Samuel Weiss

1953

 Maurice Belz
 Enrique Blanco
 Albert H. Bowker
 K. A. Brownlee
 Selwyn D. Collins
 Tore Dalenius
 Joseph F. Daly
 Kingsley Davis
 
 J. Edward Ely
 Ernest M. Fisher
 Lester Frankel
 Raymond W. Goldsmith
 Boyd Harshbarger
 H. O. Hartley
 Walter E. Hoadley
 Hans Kellerer
 Arnold J. King
 Dudley Kirk
 E. F. Lindquist
 Glenn E. McLaughlin
 Carmen A. Miró
 Harry G. Romig
 William Rae Thompson
 Alfred N. Watson
 A. E. R. Westman
 Ralph A. Young

1954

 Irving W. Burr
 Paul C. Clifford
 Maxwell R. Conklin
 Florence Nightingale David
 François J. Divisia
 
 Paul Horst
 Clyde V. Kiser
 Donald Mainland
 Eli S. Marks
 J. T. Marshall
 Herbert Solomon

1955

 Charles A. Bicking
 John W. Boatwright
 Raymond T. Bowman
 George E. P. Box
 Miles L. Colean
 Cuthbert Daniel
 Georges Darmois
 Wilfrid Dixon
 Robert J. Eggert Sr.
 Harold F. Greenway
 Louis Guttman
 Samuel P. Hayes Jr.
 Tulo H. Montenegro
 Harold Nisselson
 Eugene W. Pike
 Grant T. Wernimont
 Frank Wilcoxon
 Theodore D. Woolsey

1956

 Frank Anscombe
 T. A. Bancroft
 Zygmunt Wilhelm Birnbaum
 Donald J. Bogue
 Lee Cronbach
 Grove W. Ensley
 Leo Goodman
 C. Horace Hamilton
 Palmer O. Johnson
 Robert E. Johnson
 Leo Katz
 Karin Kock-Lindberg
 Paul Lazarsfeld
 Erich Leo Lehmann
 Geoffrey H. Moore
 Calvin F. Schmid
 Robert L. Thorndike

1957

 Max A. Bershad
 Ralph A. Bradley
 Grant I. Butterbaugh
 Samuel Lee Crump
 A. J. Duncan
 Benjamin Epstein
 Irwin Friend
 
 George Katona
 William C. Krumbein
 Bangnee Alfred Liu
 Frederic M. Lord
 Louis J. Paradiso
 Phillip J. Rulon
 Walter F. Ryan
 Francis X. Schumacher
 Ledyard Tucker

1958

 Harry Alpert
 Louis H. Bean
 David van Dantzig
 Ernest J. Engquist Jr.
 Walter T. Federer
 John W. Fertig
 Ezra Glaser
 Edwin D. Goldfield
 Wassily Hoeffding
 A. J. Jaffe
 John E. Kerrich
 William Kruskal
 Henry L. Lucas Jr.
 Ellis R. Ott
 William H. Shaw
 Herbert Sichel
 Lazare Teper
 Benjamin J. Tepping
 James Tobin
 Mary N. Torrey
 Mason E. Wescott

1959

 Kenneth Arrow
 Jules Backman
 Ralph E. Burgess
 Ansley J. Coale
 William S. Connor Jr.
 Clyde Coombs
 Bernard G. Greenberg
 H. C. Hamaker
 Earl E. Houseman
 Leslie Kish
 Morton Kramer
 Gerald J. Lieberman
 Dennis Lindley
 John Mandel
 Philip J. McCarthy
 Paul Meier
 Guy Orcutt
 Daniel O. Price
 Roy Reierson
 Irving H. Siegel
 Charles D. Stewart

1960

 Allan Birnbaum
 Joseph M. Cameron
 Edwin L. Crow
 James Durbin
 John E. Freund
 Roy C. Geary
 Samuel W. Greenhouse
 Thomas N. E. Greville
 Max Halperin
 Clifford Hildreth
 Allyn W. Kimball Jr.
 George Kuznets
 Felix E. Moore
 Almarin Phillips
 John R. H. Shaul
 Rosedith Sitgreaves
 Joseph Steinberg
 Irene Barnes Taeuber
 Milton Everett Terry
 Jan Tinbergen
 David L. Wallace
 Max A. Woodbury
 Jane Worcester

1961

 George A. Barnard
 Oscar K. Buros
 Harry Campion
 Douglas G. Chapman
 Herman Chernoff
 Bruno de Finetti
 Otis Dudley Duncan
 Robert Ferber
 Karl A. Fox
 Donald A. S. Fraser
 Dorothy M. Gilford
 Hendrik S. Houthakker
 J. Stuart Hunter
 Howard Levene
 Prasanta Chandra Mahalanobis
 Margaret E. Martin
 W. Parker Mauldin
 Iwao M. Moriyama
 Lincoln E. Moses
 Gottfried E. Noether
 Jackson A. Rigney
 Ernest Rubin
 I. Richard Savage
 Leslie James Savage Jr.
 Robert Schlaifer
 Julius Shiskin
 Milton Sobel
 Herbert C. S. Thom

1962

 Moses Abramovitz
 Gertrude Bancroft
 David Blackwell
 David R. Cox
 Herbert A. David
 Samuel J. Dennis
 David B Duncan
 Maurice Irving Gershenson
 Abraham Goldberg
 Selma Fine Goldsmith
 William M. Haenszel
 Morris Hamburg
 Frank Allan Hanna
 Paul Gustav Homeyer
 Clyde Young Kramer
 Wassily Leontief
 Nathan Mantel
 John Mauchly
 Robert James Myers
 George Edward Nicholson Jr.
 Gail Barker Oakland
 Ingram Olkin
 John W. Pratt
 Howard Raiffa
 Harry V. Roberts
 Walt R. Simmons
 Martin Wilk
 Marvin Zelen

1963

 Robert Abelson
 Jacob E. Bearman
 Robert Bechhofer
 Howard George Brunsman
 A. Clifford Cohen Jr.
 Paul M. Densen
 Walter Elliott Duffett
 John Dana Durand
 Solomon Dutka
 George L. Edgett
 George Garvy
 Seymour Geisser
 Leon Gilford
 Harold Goldstein
 J. Roe Goodman
 Franklin A. Graybill
 John Gurland
 Millard Hastay
 Jan Hemelrijk
 Robert L. Kahn
 John Whitefield Kendrick
 Solomon Kullback
 Stanley Lebergott
 Erwin Louis LeClerg
 Fred C. Leone
 Sebastian Barkann Littauer
 Patrick Joseph Loftus
 Herman P. Miller
 Robert J. Myers
 Emanuel Parzen
 Leon Pritzker
 Richard Ruggles
 Marvin A. Schneiderman
 George Stigler
 Donovan Jerome Thompson
 Oris Vernon Wells
 Kenneth Burdg Williams
 Seymour L. Wolfbein
 Jacob Yerushalmy

1964

 Roberto Bachi
 Petter Jakob Bjerve
 Daniel Creamer
 Arthur P. Dempster
 James R. Duffett
 David Durand
 Alva L. Finkner
 John M. Firestone
 Spencer Mike Free Jr.
 John J. Gart
 Shanti S. Gupta
 H. Leon Harter
 Virginia Thompson Holran
 Robert Hooke
 J. Edward Jackson
 Sidney A. Jaffe
 Bernard D. Karpinos
 Nathan Morris Koffsky
 Boyd Ladd
 John B. Lansing
 Margaret P. Martin
 James Llewellyn Mc Pherson
 Marc Nerlove
 Donald B. Owen
 Lila Knudsen Randolph
 J. N. K. Rao
 Hersey E. Riley
 Abe Rothman
 John G. Saw
 Morris J. Solomon
 Harvey M. Wagner
 Joseph Waksberg
 John T. Walsh

1965

 Russell L. Ackoff
 Beatrice Aitchison
 K. S. Banerjee
 Dana M. Barbour
 Gary Becker
 Enrique Chacon
 Jacob B. Chassan
 C. West Churchman
 W. H. Clatworthy
 William H. Cook
 Sidney J. Cutler
 David R. Dessel
 Charles Dunnett
 Ivan Fellegi
 Charles E. Ferguson
 Donald P. Gaver
 Leon Greenberg
 Douglas Greenwald
 Zvi Griliches
 Earl O. Heady
 Daniel G. Horvitz
 Thomas B. Jabine
 George Jaszi
 Norman Lloyd Johnson
 Dale W. Jorgenson
 David L. Kaplan
 Marvin A. Kastenbaum
 John W. Lehman
 Herbert H. Marks
 Ida Craven Merriam
 Claus A. Moser
 John Neter
 Robert B. Pearl
 Frank Proschan
 Norman C. Severo
 Monroe G. Sirken
 Alan Stuart
 Daniel Teichroew
 Malcolm E. Turner Jr.
 Slobodan S. Zarkovich

1966

 Jack Alterman
 V. Lewis Bassie
 Carl A. Bennett
 Hugh D. Brunk
 Arnold E. Chase
 Lawrence V. Conway
 Morris H. DeGroot
 Edward F. Denison
 Cyrus Derman
 Sylvain Ehrenfeld
 Carl L. Erhardt
 Holly C. Fryer
 Clayton Gehman
 Robert J. Hader
 William J. Hall
 James W. Knowles
 Helen Humes Lamale
 Albert Madansky
 Frank J. Massey Jr.
 Robert J. Monroe
 Vito Natrella
 Jack L. Ogus
 
 Ruth Rice Puffer
 Ronald Pyke
 George J. Resnikoff
 Douglas S. Robson
 David Rosenblatt
 Ahmed Ebada Sarhan
 Walter L. Smith
 Geoffrey Watson
 Louis Weiner

1967

 Abraham Aidenoff
 Richard E. Barlow
 Geoffrey Beall
 Ronald H. Beattie
 Herbert Bienstock
 Howard Brill
 Byron W.M. Brown Jr.
 Robert J. Buehler
 Arthur A. Campbell
 Richard A. Freund
 Donald A. Gardiner
 Edmund A. Gehan
 Paul C. Glick
 Robert V. Hogg
 David V. Huntsberger
 F. Thomas Juster
  Salem H. Khamis
 Ingrid C. Kildegaard
 Paruchuri R. Krishnaiah
 Philip S. Lawrence
 Robert E. Lipsey
 Richard B. McHugh
 Jacob Mincer
 Sigeiti Moriguti
 Nathan Morrison
 Ganapati P. Patil
 Joan R. Rosenblatt
 Arthur M. Ross
 Sam Shapiro
 Harry Smith Jr
 Julian Stanley
 William F. Taylor
 Ralph S. Woodruff

1968

 Sidney Addelman
 Leo A. Aroian
 Lyle D. Calvin
 Chin Long Chiang
 Richard G. Cornell
 C. Philip Cox
 Olive Jean Dunn
 Gerald J. Glasser
 Ramanathan Gnanadesikan
 Arthur Goldberger
 
 James E. Grizzle
 Robert D. Grove
 William C. Guenther
 Margaret Gurney
 Bernard Harris
 Charles Roy Henderson
 Evelyn M. Kitagawa
 Milos Macura
 David D. Mason
 Albert Mindlin
 Paul D. Minton
 James N. Morgan
 Donald F. Morrison
 Milton Moss
 Raymond Nassimbene
 Arthur M. Okun
 Alan Ross
 Oswald K. Sagen
 Hilary L. Seal
 Shayle R. Searle
 Daniel B. Suits
 Lester G. Telser
 Henri Theil
 Harry C. Trelogan

1969

 Om P. Aggarwal
 Virgil L. Anderson
 Lenore E. Bixby
 Irwin D. J. Bross
 George W. Brown
 Theodore Colton
 Marie D. Eldridge
 Robert C. Elston
 William A. Ericson
 K. Ruben Gabriel
 John P. Gilbert
 Vidyadhar P. Godambe
 Bruce W. Kelly
 John C. Koop
 Charles B. Lawrence Jr.
 Everett S. Lee
 C. C. Li
 Julius Lieblein
 Eugene Lukacs
 Colin L. Mallows
 Rupert G. Miller Jr.
 Jack Moshman
 Eva L. Mueller
 Jack Nadler
 Lloyd S. Nelson
 Wesley L. Nicholson
 K. C. Sreedharan Pillai
 Richard Platek
 Harry M. Rosenblatt
 Pranab K. Sen
 David A. Sprott
 Robert G. Steel
 Alan B. Sunter
 Erling Sverdrup
 James S. Williams

1970

 Anita K. Bahn
 Ishver S. Bangdiwala
 Charles B. Bell Jr.
 Wallace R. Blischke
 George H. Brown
 Edward C. Bryant
 Carl Christ
 Arthur M. Dutton
 Bradley Efron
 Robert M. Elashoff
 Lila Elveback
 Joseph L. Gastwirth
 Shriniwas K. Katti
 Chinubhai G. Khatri
 Jan Kmenta
 Samuel Kotz
 Harry H. H. Ku
 Malcolm R. Leadbetter
 Daniel B. Levine
 Abraham Lilienfeld
 Nancy Mann
 Jerome A. Mark
 Max R. Mickey Jr.
 M. N. Murthy
 Patrick L. Odell
 Bernard Ostle
 Joel Popkin
 Irving Rottenberg
 Jagdish S. Rustagi
 Sam C. Saunders
 Martin Schatzoff
 Robert S. Schultz III
 Mindel C. Sheps
 M. M. Siddiqui
 John H. Smith
 Jaya Srivastava
 John R. Stockton
 W. A. Thompson Jr.
 Beatrice N. Vaccara
 Colin White
 William H. Williams
 Arnold Zellner

1971

 David W. Alling
 Rolf E. Bargmann
 Saul Blumenthal
 R. Darrell Bock
 Mavis B. Carroll
 Martin H. David
 Norman R. Draper
 Morris L. Eaton
 Jacob J. Feldman
 J. Leroy Folks
 Ronald Freedman
 Narayan C. Giri
 Morris R. Goldman
 John A. Hartigan
 Hyman B. Kaitz
 Karol J. Krótki
 Joseph Kruskal
 Richard G. Krutchkoff
 Anant M. Kshirsagar
 James E. Mosimann
 Cristina Parel
 Bernard S. Pasternack
 Madan L. Puri
 Dana Quade
 B. Leo Raktoe
 Ernest M. Scheuer
 Jayaram Sethuraman
 Eleanor Bernert Sheldon
 Leonard R. Shenton
 B. V. Sukhatme
 Michael E. Tarter
 V. R. Uppuluri
 D. Ransom Whitney
 Marshall K. Wood
 George Zyskind

1972

 David R. Brillinger
 Ben Burdetsky
 Arthur Cohen
 Morris N. Cohen
 Edwin B. Cox
 Satya D. Dubey
 Philip E. Enterline
 James D. Esary
 Stephen Fienberg
 Wayne Fuller
 Jean D. Gibbons
 Leon J. Gleser
 Tavia Gordon
 J. Richard Grant
 Harold W. Guthrie
 Irwin Guttman
 Irene Hess
 Bruce M. Hill
 Myles Hollander
 Carl E. Hopkins
 Denis F. Johnston
 Harold A. Kahn
 Balvant K. Kale
 Shirley Kallek
 Bundhit Kantabutra
 Robert W. Kennard
 Gary G. Koch
 H. S. Konijn
 Ernest Kurnow
 Benoit Mandelbrot
 Ann R. Miller
 Sylvia Ostry
 Edward B. Perrin
 Earl S. Pollack
 Prem S. Puri
 C. R. Rao
 Stanley Schor
 E. Fred Schultz
 H. Fairfield Smith
 George P. Steck
 Chris P. Tsokos
 John W. Wilkinson

1973

 John J. Bartko
 Gilbert W. Beebe
 Peter J. Bickel
 Edgar Bisgyer
 Raj Chandra Bose
 Richard C. Clelland
 Richard Cyert
 Somesh Das Gupta
 Constance van Eeden
 Joseph L. Fleiss
 I. J. Good
 Gerald J. Hahn
 Sam Hedayat
 Ronald R. Hocking
 Seymour Jablon
 Joseph Born Kadane
 Lambert H. Koopmans
 Badrig M. Kurkjian
 C. Michael Lanphier
 Peter A. W. Lewis
 B. W. Lindgren
 Martin L. Marimont
 Donald R. Mc Neil
 Paul W. Mielke Jr.
 Vrudhula K. Murthy
 Wayne B. Nelson
 Melvin R. Novick
 Charles P. Quesenberry
 Carl-Erik Särndal
 Leopold Schmetterer
 Amode R. Sen
 Robert J. Serfling
 Jacob S. Siegel
 Joseph V. Talacko
 George C. Tiao
 H. Bradley Wells
 Shelly Zacks

1974

 Arthur E. Albert
 Vasant P. Bhapkar
 Hubert M. Blalock Jr.
 Glenn W. Brier
 E. Earl Bryant
 Helen C. Chase
 John S. Chipman
 Gregory Chow
 Virginia A. Clark
 Fred Ederer
 Murray A. Geisler
 Goldine C. Gleser
 Arnold F. Goodman
 William L. Hays
 David G. Hoel
 Harold F. Huddleston
 Karl G. Jöreskog
 Jack Kiefer
 Henry O. Lancaster
 Gilles Laurent
 William H. Lawton
 Richard F. Link
 Barry H. Margolin
 Raymond H. Myers
 Janet L. Norwood
 Junjiro Ogawa
 Mollie Orshansky
 Ewan Stafford Page
 Edward Pollak
 S. James Press
 Judah Rosenblatt
 Norman B. Ryder
 Nozer D. Singpurwalla
 Marie Wann
 Wilfred J. Westlake

1975

 Barbara A. Bailar
 John Christian Bailar
 Yvonne Bishop
 Colin R. Blyth
 Mark Brown
 James M. Dickey
 Joseph W. Duncan
 Otto Eckstein
 John W. Gorman
 William L. Harkness
 David A. Harville
 David Hogben
 Paul W. Holland
 James G. Kalbfleisch
 Robert E. Lewis
 Donald Marquardt
 Bruce J. Mc Donald
 Mervin E. Muller
 Michael D. Perlman
 Edward G. Schilling
 Seymour M. Selig
 William Seltzer
 Michael A. Stephens
 Jack E. Triplett
 Graham B. Wetherill
 R. Keith Zeigler

1976

 Helen Abbey
 John H. Aiken
 Vincent Barabba
 Kimiko O. Bowman
 Norman Breslow
 Manning Feinleib
 David G. Gosslee
 Joseph Albert Greenwood
 Robert H. Hanson
 Peter W. M. John
 M. Vernon Johns Jr.
 Brian L. Joiner
 Richard Hunn Jones
 Gunnar Kulldorff
 Regina Loewenstein
 Anders S. Lunde
 Paul McCracken
 Robert Parke
 Richard E. Remington
 Jeanne Clare Ridley
 Sally Ronk
 Richard M. Royall
 Richard M. Scammon
 Stephen Stigler
 John Van Ryzin
 Harry Weingarten
 Victor Zarnowitz

1977

 David F. Andrews
 Joseph L. Ciminera
 John S. De Cani
 Fred Frishman
 David W. Gaylor
 Charles D. Jones
 Kantilal Mardia
 Jane Menken
 Robin Plackett
 Des Raj
 Dorothy P. Rice
 Harry M. Rosenberg
 Irving Roshwalb
 Donald Rubin
 Ray E. Schafer
 Daniel G. Seigel
 Patricia Shontz
 Ronald D. Snee
 Paul Switzer
 Kenneth T. Wallenius
 Hans Zeisel
 Meyer Zitter

1978

 Abdelmonem A. Afifi
 Takeshi Amemiya
 Joseph R. Assenzo
 Robert G. Easterling
 Janet D. Elashoff
 Alan E. Gelfand
 Robert M. Hauser
 Susan Horn
 Kenneth Land
 Carl M. Metzler
 Krishnan Namboodiri
 Gad Nathan
 David Salsburg
 John W. Van Ness
 Donald G. Watts
 John T. Webster
 Allan H. Young
 Dudley E. Young

1979

 Debabrata Basu
 Abraham J. Berman
 Gouri K. Bhattacharyya
 William J. Blot
 Robert E. Bohrer
 J. Douglas Carroll
 Ana Casís
 William Jay Conover
 Frank Denton
 Paul I. Feder
 Polly Feigl
 Lloyd D. Fisher
 Martin R. Frankel
 William J. Hemmerle
 David Hinkley
 William C. Hunter
 Robert A. Israel
 William J. Kennedy
 Carl F. Kossack
 Mary Grace Kovar
 Peter A. (Tony) Lachenbruch
 Robert J. Lundegard
 William Mendenhall III
 Toby J. Mitchell
 Beatrice S. Orleans
 David A. Pierce
 Richard E. Quandt
 Ronald H. Randles
 Tim Robertson
 Edward Wegman

1980

 James R. Abernathy
 Lynne Billard
 Christopher Bingham
 John M. Chambers
 Otto Dykstra Jr.
 Paul E. Green
 Chester W. Harris
 David C. Hoaglin
 Alan T. James
 J. Aneurin John
 Richard A. Johnson
 Graham Kalton
 Roy R. Kuebler Jr.
 M. Clinton Miller III
 Roger H. Moore
 Charles Nam
 Burton H. Singer
 Judith Tanur
 Grace Wahba
 Calvin Zippin

1981

 Hirotugu Akaike
 Barry C. Arnold
 Jesse C. Arnold
 David W. Bacon
 Noel S. Bartlett
 Donald W. Behnken
 Thomas J. Boardman
 Barbara Boyes
 David P. Byar
 Lai Kow Chan
 Estelle Bee Dagum
 Edward J. Dudewicz
 William H. DuMouchel
 George T. Duncan
 Michael Gent
 James Goodnight
 Donald Guthrie
 Robert I. Jennrich
 Jon R. Kettenring
 William E. Kibler
 Richard A. Kronmal
 Charles E. Land
 Mary Gibbons Natrella
 Robert E. Odeh
 John E. Patterson
 Donald A. Pierce
 John S. Ramberg
 Naomi D. Rothwell
 Thomas A. Ryan Jr.
 Fritz J. Scheuren
 William R. Schucany
 Joseph Sedransk
 Theodor D. Sterling
 Edward Tufte
 Roy E. Welsch
 Fred S. Wood

1982

 Charles F. Cannell
 Raymond J. Carroll
 William S. Cleveland
 R. Dennis Cook
 William F. Eddy
 Jonas H. Ellenberg
 James E. Gentle
 María Elena González Mederos
 Henry L. Gray
 Robert Groves
 William J. Hill
 Arthur E. Hoerl
 Ronald L. Iman
 Eva E. Jacobs
 Emil H. Jebe
 Beat Kleiner
 Gary C. McDonald
 David S. Moore
 Ross Prentice
 Samuel H. Preston
 Carol K. Redmond
 Francisco J. Samaniego
 Josef Schmee
 Justus F. Seely
 B. V. Shah
 Stanley L. Warner
 William Weiss
 Kirk M. Wolter
 Farroll T. Wright

1983

 Asit P. Basu
 Norman Bradburn
 Jacob Cohen
 Mitchell H. Gail
 A. Ronald Gallant
 Jane F. Gentleman
 Francis G. Giesbrecht
 Bert F. Green Jr.
 Shelby J. Haberman
 Agnes M. Herzberg
 Klaus Hinkelmann
 Lawrence J. Hubert
 V. S. Huzurbazar
 Dallas E. Johnson
 Benjamin F. King
 Donald W. King
 Nan Laird
 Robert L. Launer
 Jerald F. Lawless
 William Q. Meeker Jr.
 Carl N. Morris
 Subhash C. Narula
 William J. Padgett
 Albert J. Reiss
 Charles B. Sampson
 Richard L. Scheaffer
 Alastair John Scott
 Beatrice Shube
 Jack Silber
 Courtenay Slater
 T. M. F. Smith
 Miron L. Straf
 Seymour Sudman
 Robert E. Tarone
 Katherine Wallman
 Robert L. Winkler

1984

 Murray Aitkin
 Lee J. Bain
 James T. Bonnen
 John A. Cornell
 John A. Flueck
 Rudolf J. Freund
 Jerome H. Friedman
 Charles E. Gates
 Malay Ghosh
 Prem K. Goel
 Charles H. Goldsmith
 C. Terrence Ireland
 Michael H. Kutner
 Kathleen Lamborn
 Robert F. Ling
 Pamela Morse
 Judith O'Fallon
 Harry O. Posten
 Richard Macey Simon
 Daniel L. Solomon
 W. Allen Spivey
 William E. Strawderman
 James R. Thompson
 Graham Neil Wilkinson

1985

 James O. Berger
 Albert D. Biderman
 Donna J. Brogan
 Thomas S. Ferguson
 A. Blanton Godfrey
 Richard F. Gunst
 John E. Hewett
 Gordon M. Kaufman
 Lynn Roy LaMotte
 Roderick J. A. Little
 Ian B. MacNeill
 Robert T. O'Neill
 Robert P. Parker
 Gladys H. Reynolds
 Wray Jackson Smith
 Mary E. Thompson
 Bruce W. Turnbull
 Howard Wainer
 C. F. Jeff Wu

1986

 Murray Aborn
 Donald A. Berry
 Walter H. Carter Jr.
 Noel Cressie
 David L. DeMets
 Kjell A. Doksum
 Joseph M. Gani
 Thomas P. Hettmansperger
 Bruce Hoadley
 Lawrence L. Kupper
 Tze Leung Lai
 Ramon C. Littell
 Glen D. Meeden
 W. Michael O'Fallon
 George G. Roussas
 Paul N. Somerville
 Muni S. Srivastava
 Kenneth W. Wachter
 Lee-Jen Wei
 Douglas A. Wolfe

1987

 Rudolf J. Beran
 Gordon J. Brackstone
 Leo Breiman
 Barry W. Brown
 Charles C. Brown
 Constance F. Citro
 Clifford C. Clogg
 Joel E. Cohen
 Lawrence H. Cox
 Richard L. Dykstra
 Robert E. Fay
 David F. Findley
 Thomas R. Fleming
 Roger A. Herriot
 John D. Kalbfleisch
 Helena C. Kraemer
 J. Richard Landis
 David A. Lane
 Eugene M. Laska
 John P. Lehoczky
 James M. Lucas
 Robert L. Mason
 James H. Matis
 Larry Alan Nelson
 Charles L. Odoroff
 Jerome Sacks
 Wesley L. Schaible
 Samuel S. Shapiro
 Paul F. Velleman
 James H. Ware
 Rita Zemach

1988

 David M. Allen
 José-Miguel Bernardo
 U. Narayan Bhat
 George Casella
 James R. Chromy
 John J. Crowley
 Stephen L. George
 Ethel Gilbert
 A. Lawrence Gould
 Martha S. Hearron
 Mark E. Johnson
 Stephen W. Lagakos
 Thomas J. Lorenzen
 Thomas A. Louis
 Robert B. Miller Jr.
 William K. Poole
 Daryl Pregibon
 John E. Rolph
 Juliet Popper Shaffer
 Robert H. Shumway
 Abraham Silvers
 Mangala P. Singh
 Malcolm S. Taylor
 Ronald A. Thisted
 Yung L. Tong
 Paul A. Tukey
 N. Scott Urquhart
 Gerald van Belle
 Willem R. Van Zwet
 Stephen B. Vardeman
 Sanford Weisberg
 James V. Zidek

1989

 Phipps Arabie
 William A. Barnett
 Richard J. Beckman
 David R. Bellhouse
 Kenneth N. Berk
 Robert F. Boruch
 Kenny S. Crump Sr.
 Cathryn S. Dippo
 Allan P. Donner
 
 Alan Greenspan
 Arjun K. Gupta
 Joseph K. Haseman
 John M. Lachin III
 Kinley Larntz
 George A. Milliken
 Warren Mitofsky
 Thomas J. Plewes
 Nancy Reid
 David Ruppert
 Ester Samuel-Cahn
 Thomas J. Santner
 Terry Speed
 J. Michael Steele
 Alice S. Whittemore
 Janet Wittes
 Eric R. Ziegel

1990

 Alan Agresti
 Richard A. Becker
 Donald L. Bentley
 Kenneth P. Burnham
 Ralph B. D'Agostino
 Siddhartha R. Dalal
 Maxwell E. Engelhardt
 John F. Geweke
 Douglas M. Hawkins
 D. Tim Holt
 Daniel Kasprzyk
 Robert E. Kass
 Joel C. Kleinman
 Dan Krewski
 James M. Landwehr
 Robert M. Loynes
 David R. Morganstein
 Vijayan Nair
 Karl E. Peace
 Daniel Pfeffermann
 D. Raghavarao
 Barbara Falkenbach Ryan
 Allan R. Sampson
 Lilly Sanathanan
 William W. Scherkenbach
 David W. Scott
 David L. Sylwester
 Anastasios A. Tsiatis
 Jessica Utts
 Robert F. Woolson
 Ronald E. Wyzga
 Sidney Stanley Young

1991

 Rich Allen
 David A. Binder
 Henry I. Braun
 Peter J. Brockwell
 Gale Rex Bryce
 Richard K. Burdick
 Robert J. Casady
 Larry H. Crow
 Lorraine Denby
 James E. Dunn
 Susan S. Ellenberg
 Eugene P. Ericksen
 Nicholas I. Fisher
 Judith D. Goldberg
 Tyler D. Hartwell
 Nicholas P. Jewell
 Diane Lambert
 Johannes Ledolter
 Peter C. O'Brien
 Olga Pendleton
 Gordon Rausser
 Bruce E. Rodda
 John H. Schuenemeyer
 Eugene F. Schuster
 Ajit C. Tamhane
 Robert L. Taylor
 Luke Tierney
 Robert K. Tsutakawa
 William T. Tucker
 Stanley Wasserman
 Susan R. Wilson
 Donald Ylvisaker

1992

 Douglas M. Bates
 Paul P. Biemer
 Patrick L. Brockett
 Daniel B. Carr
 Naihua Duan
 Nancy Flournoy
 Alan J. Gross
 David P. Harrington
 Lyle V. Jones
 André I. Khuri
 Ralph L. Kodell
 Abba M. Krieger
 Kuang-Kuo Gordon Lan
 James M. Lepkowski
 Judith T. Lessler
 Ruth E. Marcus
 Harry F. Martz
 Daniel McGee
 Clyde A. McGilchrist
 Peter R. Nelson
 Colm A. O'Muircheartaigh
 Christopher J. Portier
 John O. Rawlings
 Paul R. Rosenbaum
 David A. Schoenfeld
 Jon J. Shuster
 Adrian F. M. Smith
 Bruce D. Spencer
 Clifford H. Spiegelman
 John D. Spurrier
 David J. Strauss
 Aaron Tenenbein
 Barbara Tilley
 Ruey-Shiong Tsay
 Richard L. Valliant
 Harry S. Wieand
 Sandy L. Zabell

1993

 Bovas Abraham
 Stanley Paul Azen
 William R. Bell
 Henry W. Block
 Peter Bloomfield
 Charles E. Caudill
 Nanjamma Chinnappa
 George W. Cobb
 Loveday L. Conquest
 Kathryn B. Davis
 David A. Freedman
 Richard D. Gelber
 Nancy Geller
 D. V. Gokhale
 Berton H. Gunter
 Hermann Habermann
 Ronald W. Helms
 Sreenivasa Rao Jammalamadaka
 Nancy J. Kirkendall
 Edward L. Korn
 Lars Lyberg
 John F. MacGregor
 George P. McCabe
 Christine E. McLaren
 Douglas C. Montgomery
 David Oakes
 Peter C. B. Phillips
 Dale L. Preston
 Louise M. Ryan
 Mark J. Schervish
 John R. Schultz
 Bimal Kumar Sinha
 Robert T. Smythe
 George Tauchen
 Stephen D. Walter
 Mike West
 Douglas A. Zahn

1994

 
 Mary Ellen Bock
 Andreas Buja
 Gail F. Burrill
 Kathryn Chaloner
 Samprit Chatterjee
 Clarence E. Davis
 Beth K. Dawson
 Persi Diaconis
 Paula Diehr
 Dennis O. Dixon
 Richard M. Dudley
 Dianne M. Finkelstein
 Joel B. Greenhouse
 Lynne B. Hare
 Yosef Hochberg
 Roger W. Hoerl
 Dean Isaacson
 Raghu N. Kacker
 Karen Kafadar
 Denise Lievesley
 Jay H. Lubin
 Peter McCullagh
 Max D. Morris
 Robb J. Muirhead
 Mary Mulry
 James D. Neaton
 Desmond F. Nicholls
 Paula Norwood
 J. Keith Ord
 Marcello Pagano
 Gordon W. Pledger
 David Pollard
 Stephen L. Portnoy
 Stanley Presser
 Adrian Raftery
 Gregory C. Reinsel
 Peter Rousseeuw
 Stephen Ruberg
 Christopher John Skinner
 Joseph N. Skwish
 William Boyce Smith
 Donna F. Stroup
 Martin A. Tanner
 Robert D. Tortora
 Bruce E. Trumbo
 Donald J. Wheeler
 Margaret C. Wu
 Linda J. Young

1995

 Susan Ahmed
 Dan Anbar
 Narayanaswamy Balakrishnan
 John E. Boyer
 Kenneth R. W. Brewer
 Shein-Chung Chow
 Brenda G. Cox
 Angela Dean
 Jay L. Devore
 Don A. Dillman
 Keith R. Eberhardt
 Reynolds Farley
 Ralph E. Folsom Jr.
 Mary A. Foulkes
 Daniel Gianola
 Stephanie J. Green
 MaryAnn Hill
 Marthana C. Hjortland
 Boris Iglewicz
 Alan J. Izenman
 Iain M. Johnstone
 Richard J. Kryscio
 Jack C. Lee
 Stanley A. Lemeshow
 Kung-Yee Liang
 Ira Longini
 Cyrus R. Mehta
 Michael M. Meyer
 Jerry L. Moreno
 Carolyn Bradshaw Morgan
 Hans-Georg Mueller
 H. Joseph Newton
 Harji I. Patel
 Walter W. Piegorsch
 Richard F. Potthoff
 Martha Farnsworth Riche
 David M. Rocke
 Keith F. Rust
 A. K. Md. Ehsanes Saleh
 Nathaniel Schenker
 W. Robert Stephenson
 C. M. Suchindran
 Wai-Yuan Tan
 William G. Warren
 Clarice Weinberg
 Jeffrey A. Witmer
 Tommy Wright
 Scott L. Zeger

1996

 Colin Begg
 Rajendra J. Bhansali
 Jean-Louis Bodin
 J. Michael Brick
 Ron Brookmeyer
 James J. Chen
 Ronald Christensen
 Jonathan D. Cryer
 Barry R. Davis
 E. Jacquelin Dietz
 Necip Doganaksoy
 Abdel H. El-Shaarawi
 Emerson J. Elliott
 Mark A. Espeland
 Betty Flehinger
 Laurence S. Freedman
 Edward L. Frome
 Gerald W. Gates
 Christian Genest
 Richard O. Gilbert
 Patricia Grambsch
 Peter Gavin Hall
 Betz Halloran
 Lee-Ann C. Hayek
 David W. Hosmer Jr.
 Michael C. Jones
 Phillip Kott
 Ronald E. Kutscher
 Anthony James Lawrance
 Elisa T. Lee
 Charles R. Mann
 Charles E. McCulloch
 Richard A. Olshen
 S. R. S. Rao Poduri
 Kenneth H. Pollock
 Fred L. Ramsey
 Jeffrey A. Robinson
 Kathryn Roeder
 James L. Rosenberger
 Bernard Rosner
 Neil C. Schwertman
 Steve G. Self
 Jerome N. Senturia
 Weichung J. Shih
 Jeffrey S. Simonoff
 J. Laurie Snell
 Herbert F. Spirer
 Donald M. Stablein
 Leonard A. Stefanski
 Jeremy M. G. Taylor
 Chih-Ling Tsai
 Clyde Tucker
 Sholom Wacholder
 Ray A. Waller
 Larry A. Wasserman
 Sam Weerahandi
 William E. Winkler
 Ann Dryden Witte
 Wayne A. Woodward
 George G. Woodworth

1997

 Juha M. Alho
 Gutti Jogesh Babu
 Shaul K. Bar-Lev
 M. J. Bayarri
 L. Mark Berliner
 Soren Bisgaard
 James M. Boyett
 Charles R. Buncher
 JeAnne R. Burg
 Tar Timothy Chen
 Vernon Chinchilli
 Joan Sander Chmiel
 Sung C. Choi
 Cynthia Clark
 Steven B. Cohen
 Delores Conway
 Victor G. De Gruttola
 Dipak K. Dey
 Don Edwards
 Peter Enis
 Luis A. Escobar
 Bernhard Flury
 Alan B. Forsythe
 Edward W. Frees
 Edward I. George
 Ramesh C. Gupta
 Ali S. Hadi
 Marc Hallin
 Daniel F. Heitjan
 Joseph Heyse
 Huynh Huynh
 Cary T. Isaki
 Wesley Orin Johnson
 William D. Kalsbeek
 Alan F. Karr
 Jerome P. Keating
 Sallie Keller McNulty
 Marek Kimmel
 Shaw-Hwa Lo
 James T. Massey
 Holly Matthews
 Robert E. McCulloch
 Robert L. Obenchain
 Alvin C. Rencher
 John A. Rice
 Winston Ashton Richards
 Rosemary Roberts
 Roland Rust
 Friedrich W. Scholz
 Jagbir Singh
 Robert R. Starbuck
 Elizabeth Stasny
 Richard Tweedie
 Martin T. Wells
 Peter H. Westfall
 William H. Woodall
 Alan M. Zaslavsky

1998

 Mir Masoom Ali
 Margo J. Anderson
 Arlene Ash
 Robert M. Bell
 Dwight B. Brock
 Barbara Everitt Bryant
 Gregory Campbell
 Christy Chuang-Stein
 Dennis D. Cox
 Marie Davidian
 Robert L. Davis
 Richard D. De Veaux
 Tisha Duggan
 Ronald S. Fecso
 Valerii V. Fedorov
 Constantine Gatsonis
 Andrew Gelman
 Subir Ghosh
 Sander Greenland
 Chien-Pai Han
 Trevor Hastie
 Michael A. Hidiroglou
 Sheryl F. Kelsey
 Arthur B. Kennickell
 Paul S. Levy
 Dennis K.J. Lin
 Bruce G. Lindsay
 Wei-Yin Loh
 Stephen W. Looney
 James Stephen Marron
 Elizabeth A. Martin
 Lyman L. McDonald
 Geoffrey McLachlan
 Thomas L. Moore
 Joseph I. Naus
 Joyce C. Niland
 Shizuhiko Nishisato
 Terence John O'Neill
 Roxy Peck
 Jane Pendergast
 Amy H. K. Racine-Poon
 James B. Ramsey
 James Robins
 Javier Rojo
 Peter E. Rossi
 Andrew L. Rukhin
 Harold B. Sackrowitz
 John Sall
 Hal S. Stern
 S. Lynne Stokes
 Chih-Ming Wang
 Jane-Ling Wang
 Mei-Cheng Wang
 Leland Wilkinson
 George W. Williams
 Judy Zeh
 Daniel Zelterman

1999

 Charles H. Alexander Jr
 Martha Aliaga
 Charles Anello
 John Bailer
 Mark P. Becker
 Roger L. Berger
 Jane M. Booker
 Bradley P. Carlin
 Alicia L. Carriquiry
 Ching-Shui Cheng
 Gregory Enas
 Michael J. Evans
 Jianqing Fan
 Arthur Fries
 Beth Gladen
 Larry V. Hedges
 Vicki Hertzberg
 James J. Higgins
 Jonathan R. M. Hosking
 Joseph G. Ibrahim
 Valen E. Johnson
 Benjamin Kedem
 Mei-Ling Ting Lee
 Albert M. Liebetrau
 David Madigan
 Joseph W. McKean
 Alvaro Munoz
 Per Aslak Mykland
 William L. Nicholls II
 Giovanni Parmigiani
 Charles A. Rohde
 N. Phillip Ross
 Sanat K. Sarkar
 Jun Shao
 Ehsan S. Soofi
 Keith A. Soper
 Michael L. Stein
 George P. H. Styan
 Roy Noriki Tamura
 H. Dennis Tolley
 Roger E. Tourangeau
 Mark G. Vangel
 Ann E. Watkins
 Daniel H. Weinberg
 Bruce S. Weir
 Lisa Weissfeld
 Robert L. Wolpert
 Wing Hung Wong
 Mark C. Yang
 Zhiliang Ying
 Stuart O. Zimmerman

2000

 Ibrahim A. Ahmad
 James H. Albert
 Douglas Anderton
 Anestis Antoniadis
 Charles K. Bayne
 Brent A. Blumenstein
 James A. Calvin
 Lynda Carlson
 William G. Cumberland
 Veronica Czitrom
 David Dickey
 Benjamin S. Duran
 Robert F. Engle
 Kathy Ensor
 Randall L. Eubank
 Eric Jeffrey Feuer
 Joseph Glaz
 Nancy Gordon
 Barry I. Graubard
 Timothy G. Gregoire
 Michael S. Hamada
 Donald R. Hedeker
 Steven C. Hillmer
 
 Kenneth J. Koehler
 Danyu Lin
 Xihong Lin
 Robin H. Lock
 Sharon Lohr
 Agustín Maravall
 John D. McKenzie Jr.
 Sally C. Morton
 Haikady N. Nagaraja
 Anthony R. Olsen
 Franz Palm
 Linda Williams Pickle
 Dale J. Poirier
 Marion R. Reynolds Jr.
 Robert H. Riffenburgh
 Paula Roberson
 Frank W. Rockhold
 Thomas P. Ryan
 Ashish Sen
 Douglas G. Simpson
 Richard L. Smith
 Edward J. Spar
 Gábor J. Székely
 Thomas R. Tenhave
 John H. Thompson
 Edward F. Vonesh
 Preston J. Waite
 Matthew P. Wand
 Suojin Wang
 Andrei Y. Yakovlev
 Heping Zhang

2001

 Michael Akritas
 Yasuo Amemiya
 Richard T. Baillie
 Karen Bandeen-Roche
 David L. Banks
 Richard A. Berk
 William C. Blackwelder
 Dennis Boos
 Kung-Sik Chan
 Michael R. Chernick
 Siddhartha Chib
 Jan de Leeuw
 Peter Diggle
 Patricia J. Doyle
 Marlene J. Egger
 Stephen G. Eick
 Fang Kaitai
 Joan Garfield
 Eric Ghysels
 Robert D. Gibbons
 David M. Giltinan
 Peter Guttorp
 Jeffrey D. Hart
 James Heckman
 Nancy E. Heckman
 Howard R. Hogan
 Jason C. Hsu
 Bruce Levin
 Kung-Jong Lui
 Thomas Mathew
 William I. Notz
 Gregory F. Piepel
 Elvezio Ronchetti
 Allan J. Rossman
 Daniel W. Schafer
 Simon J. Sheather
 Eric P. Smith
 Steven M. Snapinn
 Donna Spiegelman
 Joan Staniswalis
 John Stufken
 Steven K. Thompson
 Wei Yann Tsai
 Hans van Houwelingen
 G. Geoffrey Vining
 Naisyin Wang
 Andrew A. White
 Dale L. Zimmerman

2002

 Demissie Alemayehu
 Edward J. Bedrick
 Michael Lee Boehnke
 Carolee Bush
 Rong Chen
 Avital Cnaan
 Michael L. Cohen
 Richard A. Davis
 Anthony C. Davison
 Darryl J. Downing
 John L. Eltinge
 Frederick W. Faltin
 Irène Gijbels
 Richard F. Goldstein
 Carol A. Gotway Crawford
 Martin A. Hamilton
 Kenneth W. Harris
 Melvin J. Hinich
 Michael D. Hughes
 John P Klein
 Richard A. Kulka
 Soumendra N. Lahiri
 Russell V. Length
 Jennifer Madans
 Linda C. Malone
 Robert W. Mee
 Edward L. Melnick
 Susan Murphy
 Sharon-Lise Normand
 Douglas W. Nychka
 Sastry G. Pantula
 Dennis K. Pearl
 Peter N. Peduzzi
 Edsel A. Pena
 Carey E. Priebe
 Marepalli B. Rao
 Wasima N. Rida
 David Rindskopf
 Pat Ruggles
 Mark D. Schluchter
 Peter J. Schmidt
 Nell Sedransk
 Stephanie Shipp
 Randy R. Sitter
 Dalene Stangl
 Moon W. Suh
 William W. S. Wei
 Alan H. Welsh

2003

 Katharine Abraham
 Lee R. Abramson
 Greg M. Allenby
 Mary Batcher
 Jay M. Bennett
 Rebecca Betensky
 Lawrence D. Brown
 Philip J. Brown
 Cavell Brownie
 George Y. H. Chi
 Cindy L. Christiansen
 John L. Czajka
 Philip M. Dixon
 James J. Filliben
 Garrett M. Fitzmaurice
 Dean A. Follmann
 Wing K. Fung
 Richard M. Heiberger
 James S. Hodges
 Burt S. Holland
 Carol House
 John T. Kent
 Ravindra Khattree
 Hira L. Koul
 Lynn Kuo
 Wai K. Li
 Robert W. Makuch
 Geert Molenberghs
 Peter Mueller
 Nitis Mukhopadhyay
 Balgobin Nandram
 Margaret A. Nemeth
 John M. Neuhaus
 Robert L. Newcomb
 Sarah Nusser
 Nitin Patel
 Trivellore E. Raghunathan
 Gary L. Rosner
 Glen A. Satten
 Nathan E. Savin
 Thomas H. Savits
 Marilyn Seastrom
 Mark R. Segal
 C. Frank Shen
 Nancy Spruill
 Neal Thomas
 Ram C. Tiwari
 Kwokleung Tsui
 Alan R. Tupek
 Harrison Wadsworth Jr.
 Lance A. Waller
 Ronald L. Wasserstein
 Robert E. Weiss
 Robert A. Wolfe

2004

 I. Elaine Allen
 Peter Bacchetti
 Laurel Beckett
 Thomas R. Belin
 Jesse A. Berlin
 James G. Booth
 R. Ronald Bosecker
 F. Jay Breidt
 Raymond L. Chambers
 Theodore C. Chang
 Joseph J. Chmiel
 Jai Won Choi
 Michael P. Cohen
 Charles S. Davis
 Francis X. Diebold
 William T. M. Dunsmuir
 Trena M. Ezzati-Rice
 Christine A. Franklin
 Dennis C. Gilliland
 Edwin J. Green
 Susan M. Hinkins
 Joel Lawrence Horowitz
 Fred L. Hulting
 Mohammad F. Huque
 Clifford M. Hurvich
 Parthasarathi Lahiri
 Lisa M. LaVange
 Michael Lavine
 Sik Y. Lee
 Shili Lin
 Amita Manatunga
 Marianthi Markatou
 David A. Marker
 Allan L. McCutcheon
 Kimberly A. McGuigan
 Xiao-Li Meng
 R. Daniel Meyer
 Chand K. Midha
 Janet Myhre
 Mari Palta
 Mark E. Payton
 Mario Peruggia
 Thomas B. Petska
 Robert N. Rodriguez
 Joseph J. Salvo
  Robert L. Santos
 Thomas H. Short
 Eric V. Slud
 Michael A. Stoto
 Dongchu Sun
 Simon Tavaré
 Nancy Temkin
 Terry M. Therneau
 Christopher K. Wikle
 G. David Williamson
 Xiao-Hua Andrew Zhou

2005

 Paul S. Albert
 J. Richard Alldredge
 Eric T. Bradlow
 Janet P. Buckingham
 Jianwen Cai
 Beth Chance
 Ming-Hui Chen
 Smiley W. Cheng
 Merlise A. Clyde
 Kevin J. Coakley
 Dianne Cook
 Susan J. Devlin
 Fred C. Djang
 Francesca Dominici
 Alan H. Dorfman
 Jean-Marie Dufour
 Christopher A. Field
 Andrew P. Grieve
 Frank E. Harrell Jr.
 Xuming He
 Chihiro Hirotsu
 Theodore R. Holford
 Hariharan K. Iyer
 KyungMann Kim
 David G. Kleinbaum
 Robert Jacob Kohn
 Jun S. Liu
 Regina Liu
 Bani K. Mallick
 David J. Marchette
 Michael E. Miller
 Stephan Morgenthaler
 Madhuri Mulekar
 Ralph G. O'Brien
 Byeong U. Park
 William C. Parr
 Jeffrey S. Passel
 Shyamal Peddada
 Michael A. Proschan
 Bonnie Ray
 William F. Rosenberger
 Susan Schechter Bortner
 Iris M. Shimizu
 Patrick E. Shrout
 Jiayang Sun
 Deborah F. Swayne
 Lonnie C. Vance
 Scott A. Vander Wiel
 Jay M. Ver Hoef
 Geert Verbeke
 Joseph S. Verducci
 Patricia Wahl
 Joanne Wendelberger
 Douglas Wiens
 Bin Yu

2006

 Christine Anderson-Cook
 Anthony C. Atkinson
 Stuart G. Baker
 Emery N. Brown
 Ngai-Hang Chan
 Rick Chappell
 Domenic V. Cicchetti
 Gauri S. Datta
 Somnath Datta
 Robyn Dawes
 Virginia A. de Wolf
 Timothy A. DeRouen
 Marie Diener-West
 Kim-Anh Do
 Nader B. Ebrahimi
 Sam Efromovich
 Joseph C. Gardiner
 Marcia Gumpertz
 Bradley A. Hartlaub
 Byron Jones
 Sadanori Konishi
 Michael R. Kosorok
 Paul H. Kvam
 Ta-Hsin Li
 Zhaohai Li
 Steven N. MacEachern
 Donald J. Malec
 Michael A. Martin
 Wendy L. Martinez
 Daniel F. McCaffrey
 Melvin L. Moeschberger
 June Morita
 Tapan K. Nayak
 Jean D. Opsomer
 Sudhir Ranjan Paul
 Daniel Pena
 Nicholas Polson
 Jing Qin
 Nalini Ravishanker
 Deborah J. Rumsey
 Oliver Schabenberger
 Xiaotong Shen
 Lianne Sheppard
 Debajyoti Sinha
 Refik Soyer
 Paul L. Speckman
 F. Michael Speed
 David S. Stoffer
 Robert L. Strawderman
 Jianguo Tony Sun
 Brajendra C. Sutradhar
 David M. Thissen
 David A. Van Dyk
 Marina Vannucci
 Sylvan Wallenstein
 Yazhen Wang
 Yuedong Wang
 Jon August Wellner
 Hongyu Zhao

2007

 Odd Aalen
 John L. Adams
 David B. Allison
 Mick P. Couper
 Lester R. Curtin
 Michael J. Daniels
 Charmaine Dean
 John J. Deely
 Rebecca Doerge
 David Draper
 David Dunson
 Scott S. Emerson
 Ziding Feng
 Linda Gage
 Marc G. Genton
 Mary W. Gray
 Patrick J. Heagerty
 Glenn M. Heller
 Nicolas Hengartner
 Joseph Hilbe
 Jacqueline Hughes-Oliver
 Jiming Jiang
 Michael I. Jordan
 David R. Judkins
 Samuel Kou
 Way Kuo
 Edward Lakatos
 Joseph B. Lang
 Chuanhai Liu
 Jye-Chyi Lu
 Robert B. Lund
 Elizabeth Margosches
 Sati Mazumdar
 Ian W. McKeague
 Leyla Mohadjer
 Katherine Monti
 Michael A. Newton
 Barry D. Nussbaum
 Walter W. Offen
 Mohsen Pourahmadi
 Allen L. Schirm
 Stuart Scott
 Yu Shen
 Joanna H. Shih
 Elizabeth H. Slate
 Jeffrey L. Solka
 Zachary G. Stoumbos
 Thérèse Stukel
 Ming T. Tan
 Antony Unwin
 Jon C. Wakefield
 Russell D. Wolfinger
 Weng Kee Wong
 Yannis G. Yatracos
 Kai Fun Yu
 Elizabeth R. Zell
 Cun-Hui Zhang
 Ji Zhang
 Li-Xing Zhu

2008

 Yacine Aït-Sahalia
 Gerald J. Beck
 Betsy Becker
 Dulal K. Bhaumik
 Chester E. Bowie
 Subhabrata Chakraborti
 Nilanjan Chatterjee
 Hugh A. Chipman
 Richard J. Cook
 Montserrat Fuentes
 Varghese George
 Katherine Halvorsen
 Brian A. Harris-Kojetin
 Steven G. Heeringa
 William G. Henderson
 Thomas Herzog
 Joseph W. Hogan
 Aparna V. Huzurbazar
 Bradley A. Jones
 Henry D. Kahn
 Roger Koenker
 Karol Józef Krótki
 Philip T. Lavin
 Charles E. Lawrence
 Carl Lee
 J. Jack Lee
 Kerry L. Lee
 Hongzhe Li
 Yi Li
 Stacy R. Lindborg
 Thomas M. Loughin
 Ronald E. McRoberts
 Devan V. Mehrotra
 Jill Montaquila
 Keith E. Muller
 Daniel S. Nettleton
 Xufeng Niu
 Nancy Obuchowski
 John J. Peterson
 Hui Quan
 Yongzhao Shao
 Eleanor Singer
 David M. Steinberg
 Don L. Stevens Jr.
 Maura Stokes
 Walter W. Stroup
 Brani D. Vidakovic
 Alyson Wilson
 Hulin Wu
 Emmanuel Yashchin
 Dennis L. Young
 Alvan O. Zarate
 Zhao-Bang Zeng

2009

 John M. Abowd
 Ejaz Ahmed
 Sung K. Ahn
 Mohammad Ahsanullah
 Stan Altan
 Naomi Altman
 Jana Asher
 Robert J. Boik
 William P. Butz
 Keumhee Carrière Chough
 Mark Chang
 Jiahua Chen
 Song X. Chen
 Ming-Yen Cheng
 Limin Clegg
 Stephen H. Cohen
 Alex Dmitrienko
 William D. Dupont
 Ronald D. Fricker Jr.
 Edward E. Gbur Jr.
 Sujit Kumar Ghosh
 Robert J. Gray
 Mark Stephen Handcock
 Philip Hougaard
 Feifang Hu
 Jian Huang
 William F. Hunt Jr.
 Rafael A. Irizarry
 David A. James
 Marshall Joffe
 Ian T. Jolliffe
 Nandini Kannan
 Theodore G. Karrison
 John E. Kimmel
 Gary King
 Mani Y. Lakshminarayanan
 Julia Lane
 Herbert K. H. Lee III
 Thomas C. M. Lee
 Michael T. Longnecker
 John E. Orban
 Peihua Qiu
 Domenic J. Reda
 Daniel J. Schaid
 Daniel O. Scharfstein
 Ashis SenGupta
 Gary M. Shapiro
 Christopher A. Sims
 Daniel A. Sorensen
 Tharuvai N. Sriram
 Duane L. Steffey
 Daniel Stram
 Randall David Tobias
 David M. Umbach
 Christopher John Wild
 Rick L. Williams
 Qiwei Yao

2010

 Paul D. Allison
 Dhammika Amaratunga
 Carol Joyce Blumberg
 James J. Colaianne
 Brent Coull
 Robert C. delMas
 Sandrine Dudoit
 Eleanor Feingold
 Subhashis Ghoshal
 Susan Groshen
 Wensheng Guo
 Sudhir Chand Gupta
 Amy H. Herring
 Joan F. Hilton
 Ming-Xiu Hu
 Hsien-Ming James Hung
 Telba Irony
 Daniel R. Jeske
 Andrew Booth Lawson
 Emmanuel M.E.H. Lesaffre
 Virginia Lesser
 Richard A. Levine
 Gang Li
 Tapabrata Maiti
 Adam T. Martinsek
 Laura McKenna
 George Michailidis
 John Francis Monahan
 Motomi Mori
 Christopher H. Morrell
 Jeri Metzger Mulrow
 Paul Ross Murrell
 Dayanand N. Naik
 Nagaraj K. Neerchal
 George Ostrouchov
 Omer Ozturk
 J. Lynn Palmer
 Wei Pan
 Sung H. Park
 Moshe Pollak
 John S. Preisser Jr.
 Annie Qu
 Fabrizio Ruggeri
 Estelle Russek-Cohen
 Carolyn M. Rutter
 Bruno Sansó
 Nora Cate Schaeffer
 Christopher H. Schmid
 Nagambal Shah
 Yu Shyr
 Brian L. Wiens
 Rongling Wu
 Haibo Zhou

2011

 Keith A. Baggerly
 Kenneth A. Bollen
 Tim P. Bollerslev
 Robert Francis Bordley
 Connie M. Borror
 Tianxi Cai
 Joseph C. Cappelleri
 Ivan S.F. Chan
 James J. Cochran
 Bruce A. Craig
 Michael R. Elliott
 Brenda L. Gaydos
 Amanda L. Golbeck
 Paul A. Gustafson
 J. Michael Hardin
 Dominique Haughton
 David M. Higdon
 Susan G. Hilsenbeck
 Alan David Hutson
 J. T. Gene Hwang
 Patricia Jacobs
 Zhezhen Jin
 Grace E. Kissling
 Eric Kolaczyk
 Kalimuthu Krishnamoorthy
 Anthony Y. C. Kuk
 Kenneth L. Lange
 Peter J. Lenk
 Runze Li
 Faming Liang
 John C. Liechty
 Aiyi Liu
 Ying Lu
 Esfandiar Maasoumi
 Ranjan Maitra
 Matthew Stuart Mayo
 Jeffrey S. Morris
 Christopher Nachtsheim
 Deborah A. Nolan
 Dimitris N. Politis
 J. Sunil Rao
 Jerome P. Reiter
 Charles J. Rothwell
 Venkatraman E. Seshan
 Thomas A. Severini
 Arvind K. Shah
 Lori Thombs
 Paul A. Tobias
 Júlia Volaufová
 Sue-Jane Wang
 Michel Wedel
 Herbert I. Weisberg
 Robert G. Wilkinson
 Fred A. Wright
 Min-Ge Xie
 Lijian Yang
 Donglin Zeng
 Hongtu Zhu

2012

 Mousumi Banerjee
 Sudipto Banerjee
 Melissa D. Begg
 DuBois Bowman
 Amy Braverman
 N. Rao Chaganty
 Dongseok Choi
 Mark R. Conaway
 Susmita Datta
 Marc N. Elliott
 Scott R. Evans
 Debashis Ghosh
 Mithat Gonen
 Robert L. Gould
 Deborah H. Griffin
 Jeffrey H. Hooper
 Nicholas J. Horton
 Joan Hu
 Michael G. Hudgens
 Gareth James
 Jae-Kwang Kim
 Michael D. Larsen
 Lawrence I-Kuei Lin
 Bo Henry Lindqvist
 Jen-Pei Liu
 Thomas Lumley
 Clyde F. Martin
 Nancy Mathiowetz
 Bhramar Mukherjee
 Anna B. Nevius
 Thomas E. Nichols
 James O'Malley
 R. Todd Ogden
 Liang Peng
 Jose C. Pinheiro
 
 Abdul J. Sankoh
 Sanjay Shete
 Judith D. Singer
 Marc A. Suchard
 Thaddeus Tarpey
 Ram C. Tripathi
 Andrea B. Troxel
 Roshan Joseph Vengazhiyil
 Colin O. Wu
 Daowen Zhang
 Kelly H. Zou
 Rebecca Zwick

2013

 Keaven M. Anderson
 Michael Baron
 Scott Berry
 William A. Brenneman
 Zongwu Cai
 Patrick J. Cantwell
 Ralph B. D'Agostino Jr.
 Timothy P. Davis
 Elizabeth DeLong
 Vladimir Dragalin
 Josée Dupuis
 Sylvia Esterby
 Christopher Genovese
 William F. Guthrie
 Timothy E. Hanson
 Jennifer A. Hoeting
 Jianhua Huang
 Sin-Ho Jung
 Mel Kollander
 Youngjo Lee
 Julie Legler
 Brian G. Leroux
 William Li
 Hua Liang
 Stuart Lipsitz
 Qing Liu
 Yufeng Liu
 Richard A. Lockhart
 J. Scott Long
 Wendy Lou
 Thomas E. Love
 Shuangge Ma
 Craig H. Mallinckrodt
 Madhuchhanda Mazumdar
 Lisa M. McShane
 Fabrizia Mealli
 Alfredo Navarro
 Susan Paddock
 Ruth Pfeiffer
 Polly Phipps
 Wolfgang Polonik
 Raquel Prado
 Yili Lu Pritchett
 Dabeeru C. Rao
 C. Shane Reese
 Greg Ridgeway
 Maria Matilde Sanchez-Kam
 Douglas E. Schaubel
 Ananda Sen
 Janet Sinsheimer
 Dylan S. Small
 Yanqing Sun
 Mahlet Getachew Tadesse
 Ingrid Van Keilegom
 Ronghui Xu
 Guosheng Yin
 Hao Zhang
 Tong Zhang
 Ji Zhu

2014

 Deepak Kr Agarwal
 Patrick Ball
 Sanjib Basu
 Nancy Bates
 Johnny Blair
 Brian Scott Caffo
 Kate Calder
 Joseph E. Cavanaugh
 Aloka G. Chakravarty
 Jie Chen
 Ying Kuen Ken Cheung
 Jeng-Min Chiou
 Bertrand S. Clarke
 Ciprian M. Crainiceanu
 Holger Dette
 Ronald Does
 Lynn Eberly
 Paul Embrechts
 A. Richard Entsuah
 Kiya Famoye
 Paul Gallo
 Martha M. Gardner
 Yulia Gel
 Peter B. Gilbert
 Mark Glickman
 Heike Hofmann
 Scott H. Holan
 Shelley Hurwitz
 Lurdes Inoue
 Qi Jiang
 Amarjot Kaur
 Harry J. Khamis
 Mimi Kim
 Frauke Kreuter
 K. B. Kulasekera
 Purushottam W. Laud
 Nicole Lazar
 Robert H. Lyles
 Leslie M. Moore
 Edward J. Mulrow
 Bin Nan
 Eva Petkova
 Bill Pikounis
 Sophia Rabe-Hesketh
 Shesh N. Rai
 Timothy J. Robinson
 Philip R. Scinto
 Larry Z. Shen
 Pedro Luis Do Nascimento Silva
 Philip B. Stark
 Stefan H. Steiner
 Elizabeth A. Stuart
 Joshua M. Tebbs
 Naitee Ting
 Tor D. Tosteson
 David C. Trindade
 Tyler John VanderWeele
 Melanie Wall
 Hansheng Wang
 Changbao Wu
 Lilly Q. Yue
 Xiaohua Douglas Zhang
 Tian Zheng

2015

 Chul W. Ahn
 Girish A. Aras
 John Aston
 Subhash C. Bagui
 Raymond P. Bain
 Peter M. Bentler
 Bruce Steven Binkowitz
 Erin Blankenship
 Ornulf Borgan
 Frank Bretz
 Eric K. Chicken
 Kennon R. Copeland
 Jill Dever
 Vanja Dukic
 Michael D. Escobar
 Duncan K. H. Fong
 Andrzej T. Galecki
 Daniel A. Griffith
 Yongtao Guan
 Susan Halabi
 John J. Hanfelt
 Jo Hardin
 Ofer Harel
 David R. Hunter
 Linda A. Jacobsen
 Timothy Johnson
 Timothy D. Johnson
 Mary J. Kwasny
 Mary Beth Landrum
 Jodi Lapidus
 Yoonkyung Lee
 James D. Leeper
 Bing Li
 Gang Li
 Peter V. Miller
 John P. Morgan
 Daniel John Nordman
 Art B. Owen
 Frank J. Potter
 Fernando A. Quintana
 Paul Rathouz
 Daniel B. Rowe
 Mary D. Sammel
 Richard Samworth
 Jaya M. Satagopan
 Haipeng Shen
 Karan P. Singh
 Robert D. Small
 Victor Solo
 Catherine Sugar
 Fengzhu Sun
 Juergen Symanzik
 Peter F. Thall
 Abdus S. Wahed
 Ying Wei
 Hadley Wickham
 Brian J. Williams
 Diane K. Willimack
 Keying Ye
 Grace Y. Yi
 Hao Helen Zhang
 Jun Zhu

2016

 Alexander Aue
 Peter C. Austin
 Veerabhadran Baladandayuthapani
 Anirban Basu
 Paul C. Beatty
 Scarlett Bellamy
 Christopher R. Bilder
 Jonaki Bose
 Karl W. Broman
 Peter Buhlmann
 Wenyaw Chan
 Cathy Woan-Shu Chen
 Cong Chen
 Ding-Geng Chen
 Joshua Chen
 Francesca Chiaromonte
 William F. Christensen
 Haitao Chu
 Christopher S. Coffey
 Peter Craigmile
 Jeffrey D. Dawson
 Wayne DeSarbo
 Ruth Etzioni
 Robert Gentleman
 Madhumita Ghosh-Dastidar
 Daniel L. Gillen
 Jan Hannig
 Murali Haran
 Rachel M. Harter
 David Haziza
 Hsin-Cheng Huang
 Yijian Huang
 Terry Hyslop
 Tim Jacobbe
 Barry W. Johnson Jr.
 Galin L. Jones
 Barry P. Katz
 Elizabeth J. Kelly
 Ruth Ann Killion
 Elizaveta Levina
 Martin A. Lindquist
 Qi Long
 Theodore C. Lystig
 Charles F. Manski
 Joel E. Michalek
 Renee H. Miller
 Hon Keung Tony Ng
 Hernando C. Ombao
 Van L. Parsons
 Limin Peng
 Gene Anthony Pennello
 Luis Raul Pericchi
 Karen L. Price
 Naomi B. Robbins
 Ingo Ruczinski
 V. A. Samaranayake
 Juned Siddique
 Michael D. Sinclair
 John W. Staudenmayer
 Rochelle E. Tractenberg
 Yuanjia Wang
 H. Amy Xia
 Xiaonan Xue
 Ann Zauber
 Chunming Zhang

2017

 Saonli Basu
 Sam Behseta
 Kiros Berhane
 James A. Bolognese
 Howard D. Bondell
 Trent D. Buskirk
 Brenda J. Crowe
 Mariza de Andrade
 Rebecca DerSimonian
 Michelle C. Dunn
 Debbie Dupuis
 William B. Fairley
 Rongwei Fu
 Cathy Furlong
 Byron Jon Gajewski
 E. Olusegun George
 Tilmann Gneiting
 Joe Fred Gonzalez Jr.
 Sat N. Gupta
 Charles B. Hall
 Toshimitsu Hamasaki
 Kenneth R. Hess
 Tim Hesterberg
 Mevin B. Hooten
 Li Hsu
 Xuelin Huang
 Xiaoming Huo
 Snehalata V. Huzurbazar
 Ron Jarmin
 Jong-Hyeon Jeong
 Eileen C. King
 Thomas R. Krenzke
 Shonda Kuiper
 Christian Léger
 Lexin Li
 Guanghan Frank Liu
 Wenbin Lu
 Ping Ma
 Yanyuan Ma
 Olga V. Marchenko
 Michael P. McDermott
 Sandeep Menon
 Jason H. Moore
 Renee H. Moore
 Jennifer D. Parker
 Roger Peng
 Victor Perez Abreu
 Michael A. Posner
 Cavan Reilly
 Steven E. Rigdon
 Anindya Roy
 Paola Sebastiani
 Rajeshwari Sridhara
 Anuj Srivastava
 Arnold J. Stromberg
 Wei Sun
 Katherine J. Thompson
 Daniell S. Toth
 George Tseng
 Fugee Tsung
 Jun Yan
 Ying Yuan

2018

 Todd A. Alonzo
 Dipankar Bandyopadhyay
 Moulinath Banerjee
 William C. Bridges Jr.
 Ying Qing Chen
 Yuguo Chen
 Peter Chien
 James M. Curran
 Nairanjana Dasgupta
 Michael E. Davern
 Aurore Delaigle
 Michael Friendly
 Ying Guo
 Weili He
 Peter David Hoff
 Chiung-Yu Huang
 Donsig Jang
 Bing-Yi Jing
 Michael W. Kattan
 Christina Kendziorski
 Jae Kyun Lee
 Ji-Hyun Lee
 Roger J. Lewis
 Mingyao Li
 Ilya A. Lipkovich
 Lei Liu
 Mengling Liu
 Brian D. Marx
 Leslie McClure
 Michael J. Messner
 Diana Miglioretti
 Brian A. Millen
 Kristen Olson
 Taesung Park
 Dionne Price
 James O. Ramsay
 Kenneth M. Rice
 Paul J. Roback
 Milo Schield
 Carl James Schwarz
 Wei Shen
 Bryan Shepherd
 Richard S. Sigman
 Steven J. Skates
 Aleksandra Slavković
 Peter X. Song
 Maya R. Sternberg
 Zhiqiang Tan
 Boxin Tang
 Nathan Tintle
 Jung-Ying Tzeng
 Huixia Judy Wang
 Lan Wang
 William W. Wang
 Yichao Wu
 Sharon Xiangwen Xie
 Fang Yao
 Yan Yu
 Ying Zhang
 Zhengjun Zhang
 Zhiwei Zhang

2019 

 Daniel W. Apley
 Huiman X. Barnhart
 Derek R. Bingham
 Babette Brumback
 Ann R. Cannon
 Hua-Hua Chang
 Jinbo Chen
 Gerda Claeskens
 Keith N. Crank
 Kate M. Crespi
 Yingying Fan
 Michael P. Fay
 Haoda Fu
 Mulugeta Gebregziabher
 Michele Guindani
 Sebastien J-P. A. Haneuse
 Alexandra L. Hanlon
 Miguel A. Hernan
 Craig A. Hill
 Jianhua Hu
 Rebecca Hubbard
 Peter B. Imrey
 Hongkai Ji
 Jiashun Jin
 Katerina Kechris
 Charles L. Kooperberg
 Eric Laber
 Michael Leo LeBlanc
 Bo Li
 Jia Li
 Yehua Li
 Jeff D. Maca
 Nandita Mitra
 Samuel Mueller
 Lei Nie
 Davy Paindaveine
 Eun Sug Park
 Judea Pearl
 Igor Pruenster
 Brian James Reich
 Jason A. Roy
 Cynthia Rudin
 Joseph L. Schafer
 Jonathan Scott Schildcrout
 John Scott
 J. Michael Shaughnessy
 David A. Stephens
 Tim B. Swartz
 Sally W. Thurston
 Alexander Tsodikov
 Pei Wang
 William J. Welch
 David Woods
 Min Yang
 Xiangrong Yin
 Menggang Yu
 Lanju Zhang
 Mu Zhu
 Hui Zou

2020 

 Edoardo Airoldi
 Garnet Anderson
 Rebecca Andridge
 Mine Çetinkaya-Rundel
 Kwun Chuen Gary Chan
 Chung-Chou H. Chang
 Fang Chen
 Yong Chen
 William Scott Clark
 Manisha Desai
 Felicity Boyd Enders
 Robert Brandon Gramacy
 Erica Groshen
 Matthew James Gurka
 Jaroslaw Harezlak
 Guido Imbens
 Anastasia Ivanova
 Yuan Ji
 Laura Lee Johnson
 Pandurang M. Kulkarni
 Hollylynne Lee
 Jeffrey T. Leek
 Sergei Leonov
 Jialiang Li
 Liang Li
 Qizhai Li
 Jason Jinzhong Liao
 Ching-Ti Liu
 Lisa Lix
 Sheng Luo
 Jinchi Lv
 Louis T. Mariano
 Rochelle Martinez
 Kary Myers
 Jennifer Clark Nelson
 Robert Alan Oster
 Mark C. Otto
 Yongming Qu
 Sarah J. Ratcliffe
 Sherri Rose
 Michael Rosenblum
 Kenneth J. Ryan
 Brisa Sánchez
 Alexandra M. Schmidt
 Matthias Schonlau
 Damla Şentürk
 Xiaofeng Shao
 Pamela A. Shaw
 Yiyuan She
 Rajeshwari Sundaram
 Lehana Thabane
 Haonan Wang
 Daniela Witten
 
 Kai Yu
 Zhengyuan Zhu
 Richard Conrad Zink

2021 

 Walter T. Ambrosius
 Kellie Archer
 Vipin Arora
 Amit Bhattacharyya
 Julia Bienias
 Jeffrey D. Blume
 Thomas M. Braun
 Jie Chen
 Zhen Chen
 Jing Cheng
 Victor De Oliveira
 Stephanie Eckman
 Elena Erosheva
 Melody Goodman
 Amelia Haviland
 Matthew J. Hayat
 Martin Ho
 Li-Shan Huang
 Kathi Irvine
 Mikyoung Jun
 Jian Kang
 Stanislav Kolenikov
 Earl C. Lawrence
 Yan Li
 Fang Liu
 Bo Lu
 Pamela D. McGovern
 Weiwen Miao
 David Ian Ohlssen
 Steve Pierson
 Sowmya R. Rao
 Jasjeet S. Sekhon
 Kimberly Sellers
 Ramalingam Shanmugam
 Russell Shinohara
 Rui Song
 Lisa M. Sullivan
 Eric Alan Vance
 Olga Vitek
 Lily Wang
 Xiao Wang
 Xiaofei Wang
 Mark Daniel Ward
 James G. Wendelberger
 Hongquan Xu
 Hongmei Zhang
 Yichuan Zhao
 Yingye Zheng

2022 

 Genevera Allen
 Emma Benn
 Veronica J. Berrocal 
 Carol Bigelow 
 Kun Chen 
 Lakshminarayan K. Choudur 
 Radu V. Craiu 
 Yuehua Cui 
 Yang Feng 
 Misrak Gezmu 
 Beth Ann Griffin 
 Stephen W. Gulyas 
 Christopher M. Hans 
 Steve Horvath
 Haiyan Huang
 Wei-Ting Hwang 
 Douglas Landsittel 
 Mark S. Levenson 
 Fan Li
 Elizabeth Mannshardt
 Kelly McConville
 Tucker S. McElroy 
 Christopher Steven McMahan 
 Knashawn H. Morales 
 Steven J. Novick 
 R. Wayne Oldford 
 Jamis Jon Perrett 
 Megan Price 
 Abel Rodriguez 
 Satrajit Roychoudhury 
 Stephan R. Sain 
 Claude Messan Setodji 
 Babak Shahbaba 
 Julia L. Sharp 
 Ali Shojaie 
 Susan M. Shortreed 
 Sean Lorenzo Simpson 
 Lu Tian 
 Theresa Utlaut
 Peng Wei 
 Brady Thomas West 
 Michael C. Wu 
 Xian-Jin Xie 
 Eric Xing
 Xinyi Xu 
 Wenxuan Zhong 
 Jianhui Zhou 
 Jose Zubizarreta

References 

 
American Statistical Association
Fellows of the American Statistical Association